The Grand Lodge of Free & Accepted Masons of Indiana is one of two statewide organizations that oversee Masonic lodges in the state of Indiana.  It was established on January 13, 1818. The Grand Lodge of Indiana's offices and archives are located in the Indianapolis Masonic Temple.

Pre-1900
The first Lodge in Indiana was created by residents of Vincennes, Indiana.  They sought a dispensation to create the Lodge from Louisville, Kentucky's Abraham Lodge #8 in 1806. One was granted in 1807, but due to the distance, they were not able to constitute the lodge.  After a second dispensation was sought in 1808, a lodge was formed on March 13, 1809, and the officers were initiated.  Other lodges in the Indiana Territory founded by the Grand Lodge of Kentucky were Madison (1815), Charlestown (1816), Melchizedek in Salem (1817), Pisgah in Corydon, Lawrenceburg, Rising Sun, and Vevay (1817).  On May 9, 1817, the Grand Lodge of Ohio granted a dispensation for Brookville Harmony Lodge in Brookville, Indiana; this lodge would remain under the Grand Lodge of Ohio for two years following the founding of Indiana's Grand Lodge.

After Indiana attained statehood, it qualified for its own Grand Lodge.  While attending the annual meeting of the Grand Lodge of Kentucky in September 1817, members of several lodges within the new state agreed to meet in Corydon with representative from all lodges and discuss the viability of forming a Grand Lodge with the State of Indiana.  On December 3, 1817, discussion began as to whether a Grand Lodge for Indiana should be formed, 354 days after Indiana gained statehood.  Eleven Freemasons from the various lodges in Indiana met in Corydon, and decided to initiate the new Grand Lodge.  Amongst these was the first Lieutenant-governor of Indiana, Christopher Harrison.  Thus, the Grand Lodge of Indiana was chartered on January 13, 1818, at the presently-named Schofield House, owned by Alexander Lanier, father of James Lanier and a Freemason as well, in Madison, Indiana.  Only three Freemasons were at both meetings.  The first Grand Master of Indiana was Alexander Buckner of Charlestown, who would later become a United States senator from Missouri.

The Grand Lodge would have its first annual meeting in Charlestown, and would alternate between cities until in 1828 it met in Indianapolis, where it has met ever since.

Indiana would not escape the anti-Masonry hysteria of the 1820s-1840.  In 1828 there were 33 lodges in Indiana.  In both 1833 and 1835 ten lodges were closed.  At one point, between 1835 and 1837, there were only twelve lodges left in Indiana.  Eighteen lodges were started during this, but only five of which lasted.  In 1834 there was even talk of abolishing the Grand Lodge.  In many of the years between 1828 and 1842, the Grand Master did not even attend the Grand Lodge meetings. By 1842 the anti-Masonry hysteria had waned, and the various Grand Lodges could again grow

Post-1900
In 1916 the Grand Lodge created the Indiana Masonic Home to support elderly Masons, the widows and orphans of Master Masons, and older members of the Order of the Eastern Star. The Home still exists in Franklin, Indiana and changed its operating name to Compass Park in 2016.

By 1957, there were more than 4 million Freemasons in the United States. The Grand Lodge of Indiana had its highest membership at that time with 185,211 members, or 4% of the state's total population of 4.5 million. Indiana at that time was the fifth largest Masonic jurisdiction in the world. Indianapolis is also home to the two largest Masonic appendant body chapters in the U.S.: throughout the 20th century, the Indianapolis Valley of the Scottish Rite at the Scottish Rite Cathedral was the world's largest Scottish Rite Valley; and the Murat Shrine was the largest body of Shriners International.

In 2016 the number of Freemasons in the Grand Lodge of Indiana was 55,553 amongst its 394 separate lodges, currently making it the sixth largest Masonic jurisdiction in the U.S.

Beginning in the early 1960s, the Grand lodge of Indiana began erecting historical markers at sites with great Masonic significance.  By 1976, 27 of these bronze plaques had been placed across the state, and the majority of them are still standing in 2018.

In 1987, the Masonic Library and Museum of Indiana was established to preserve and protect historical items and records of Indiana Freemasonry. Much of the initial collection was amassed for the 1968 sesquicentennial celebration of the Grand Lodge's founding, but that mission has continued and expanded. The MLMI is located today in the Indianapolis Masonic Temple, which is also the headquarters of the state's fraternity. It is open to the public.

There are also 24 active predominantly African-American, Prince Hall Affiliated (PHA) Masonic lodges in Indiana administered by the Most Worshipful Prince Hall Grand Lodge of Indiana F&AM, which was established September 16, 1856. There were approximately 1,000 Prince Hall Masons in Indiana in 2018. The two Indiana grand lodges officially declared mutual recognition in 1998 and enjoy reciprocal visitation.

Famous Freemasons from Indiana include John Tipton, Oliver P. Morton, Lew Wallace, General Charles Cruft, Eugene V. Debs, Art Nehf, Birch Evans Bayh Sr., Red Skelton, William H. Hudnut, Colonel Harland Sanders, Dave Thomas, Robb Spears, Chapman Jay Root, Caleb B. Smith, David Goodnow, Paul Page, Gus Grissom, and Carl Erskine.

Gallery

References

Official site

Indiana
Freemasonry in the United States
Organizations based in Indiana
1818 establishments in Indiana